Haroldston West is a rural coastal parish in west Pembrokeshire, Wales,  west of Haverfordwest. It is in the community of Merlin's Bridge.

History
A number of prehistoric remains exist in the parish.

Haroldston West parish was in the ancient Hundred of Rhos, Pembrokeshire, and in 1833 had a population of 155. Its name is taken from that of an Anglo-Norman who held local lands.

During the Second World War there was a Relief Landing Ground (RLG) for RAF Withybush called Haroldston airfield which was never used for emergency landings.

Church
The parish church is dedicated to St Madoc of Ferns. Before the 1880s the church was a "barn-like old church of nave and chancel with big sash windows and a makeshift roof of salvaged ships' timbers" but had become derelict. It was rebuilt in 1885.

References

External links

Villages in Pembrokeshire